Sugrovo is a rural locality in Bolsheugonsky Selsoviet Rural Settlement, Lgovsky District, Kursk Oblast, Russia. Population:

Geography 
The village is located on the Seym River, 47 km from the Russia–Ukraine border, 60 km south-west of Kursk, 3 km south-east of the district center – the town Lgov, 6.5 km from the selsoviet center – Bolshiye Ugony.

 Climate
Sugrovo has a warm-summer humid continental climate (Dfb in the Köppen climate classification).

Transport 
Sugrovo is located on the road of regional importance  (Kursk – Lgov – Rylsk – border with Ukraine) as part of the European route E38, 3 km from the road  (Lgov – Sudzha), on the road of intermunicipal significance  (38K-017 – Sugrovo – railway station Lgov), in the vicinity of the railway halt 401 km (railway line Lgov I — Kursk).

The rural locality is situated 61 km from Kursk Vostochny Airport, 139 km from Belgorod International Airport and 270 km from Voronezh Peter the Great Airport.

References

Notes

Sources

Rural localities in Lgovsky District